Matthew Harley Goss (born 5 November 1986) is a former Australian professional road and track racing cyclist, his final professional team before retirement was the UCI Professional Continental team . He first competed in track cycling before making a transition to the road. He earned a gold medal at the 2006 UCI Track Cycling World Championships in the Team Pursuit event and came in second place at the 2011 World Championships Road race. He also won the 2010 GP Ouest-France, the 2011 Milan–San Remo as well as 2 stages of the Giro d'Italia, among other victories.

Career 
Born in Launceston, Tasmania, Goss started in the sport competing in track cycling. In 2005, he won a bronze medal in the Team Pursuit at the World Championships in Los Angeles along with Ashley Hutchinson, Mark Jamieson and Stephen Wooldridge. Then the following year he won the gold medal in Bordeaux with Peter Dawson, Mark Jamieson and Stephen Wooldridge.

In parallel with the successes on the track, he started his career on the road with the Australian team Southaustralia.com–AIS team which participated in major competitions dedicated to the Under-23. Goss had numerous victories, including Liberation Grand Prix and the Tour of the Regions.

In 2007 he turned pro with Bjarne Riis's . In the first two years as a professional he won two stages at the Tour of Britain, one in 2007 and another in the next edition. Goss finished second at the Commerce Bank International Championship and third at the Delta Profronde. With CSC he also won the Eindhoven Team Time Trial 2007, an UCI ProTour team time trial included in the calendar.

In 2008, he took the first stage of the Herald Sun Tour. In these races he became known for his sprinter characteristics and also demonstrated qualities in other disciplines, proving strong on the cobbles, finishing third in the Belgian semi-classic Kuurne–Brussels–Kuurne.

He confirmed his qualities later in 2009 by winning Paris–Brussels, two stages of the Tour de Wallonie and finishing third at Gent–Wevelgem.

2010 

On 16 May 2010 he won the ninth stage of the Giro d'Italia with arrival in Cave de Tirreni, but had to withdraw from the Giro on 23 May due to illness. In August he won the GP Ouest-France, beating Tyler Farrar in the sprint. He also claimed victory in America in the Philadelphia International Championship and a stage win at the Danmark Rundt.

2011 

He began the 2011 season racing in Australia the Bay Classic Series, a criterium with a number of ranking points, winning the first and the fourth round and the final in an all Tasmanian team. He also came second in the National Championship. He continued his winning streak by winning the Cancer Council Classic, and met success in the Tour Down Under, winning the first stage, the points classification and finishing in second place overall. Then in the biggest win of his career, he won the 2011 Milan–San Remo Classic on Saturday 19 March. He succeeded in passing the ultimate climb of the day with the lead group and out-sprinted Fabian Cancellara of the  squad to take the victory.

On 6 September 2011, it was announced that Goss would be joining the  team for its inaugural season in 2012.

2012 

In April, Goss took the points classification of the Tour of Turkey. He did not win a stage, but came close to it on Stage 4, where Mark Renshaw edged him on the line by an extremely narrow margin.

He added a prestigious victory to his palmares at the Giro d'Italia, taking the third stage after Roberto Ferrari caused a crash that took down several riders in the finale, including 's Mark Cavendish. He withdrew from the Giro after taking the sixth place on Stage 13, explaining that he wanted to prepare himself properly for his two main objectives of the season, the Tour de France and the London Olympics' road race. Throughout La Grande Boucle, Goss would do battle with 's Peter Sagan for the Green jersey awarded to the best sprinter. However, his chances were greatly reduced in Stage 12 when he was handed a 30-point penalty for sprinting dangerously, touching Sagan after swerving several feet to his left while the two were going for the line. He finally took the third place of the points classification behind Sagan and André Greipel.

2015 

On 18 September 2014 it was announced that Goss will be riding for Team MTN-Qhubeka in 2015.

2016 

Personal life 
Goss supports the pivotal role of junior development and pathway program cycling teams in the state where he cultivated his cycling skills as a junior, and subsequently holds the title of adviser to the management committee and team ambassador for the RECAB cycling development team in Tasmania since 2009.

Goss appeared on billboards in Australia for Toshiba with teammates from the 2006 Commonwealth Games.

He lives and trains in Monte Carlo, Monaco.

Major results

Road

2005
 1st Stage 1 Tour of Japan
2006
 1st Gran Premio della Liberazione
 Vuelta a Navarra
1st  Points classification
1st Stages 2 & 3
 1st Stage 1 Giro delle Regioni
 1st Stage 3 Baby Giro
 2nd Trofeo Città di Brescia
 2nd Coppa Città di Asti
2007
 1st Stage 3 Tour of Britain
 1st Eindhoven Team Time Trial
 2nd Commerce Bank International Championship
 3rd Delta Profronde
2008
 Tour of Britain
1st  Points classification
1st Stage 2
 Herald Sun Tour
1st  Points classification
1st Stage 1
 3rd Kuurne–Brussels–Kuurne
2009
 1st Paris–Brussels
 Tour de Wallonie
1st Stages 3 & 5
 2nd Grand Prix de Denain
 3rd Gent–Wevelgem
 10th Overall Vuelta a Murcia
2010
 1st GP Ouest–France
 1st Philadelphia International Championship
 1st Stage 9 Giro d'Italia
 1st Stage 1 Danmark Rundt
 1st Stage 1 (TTT) Vuelta a España
2011
 1st  Overall Bay Classic Series
1st Stages 1 & 4
 1st Milan–San Remo
 1st Cancer Council Helpline Classic
 1st Stage 3 Paris–Nice
 1st Stage 8 Tour of California
 1st Stage 2 Tour of Oman
 2nd  Road race, UCI World Championships
 2nd Road race, National Championships
 2nd Overall Tour Down Under
1st  Sprints classification
1st Stage 1
 8th London–Surrey Cycle Classic
2012
 1st Stage 3 Giro d'Italia
 1st  Points classification, Tour of Turkey
 1st Stage 1 (TTT) Tirreno–Adriatico
 4th GP Ouest–France
2013
 1st Stage 2 Tirreno–Adriatico
 1st Stage 4 (TTT) Tour de France
 2nd Cancer Council Helpline Classic
2014
 1st Stage 2 Bay Classic Series

Grand Tour general classification results timeline

Track

2004
 UCI World Junior Championships
1st  Team pursuit
1st  Madison
2005
 1st  Team pursuit, National Championships
2006
 1st  Team pursuit, UCI World Championships
 1st  Team pursuit, National Championships
 2nd  Team pursuit, Commonwealth Games

References

External links 

 
 Palmares at Cycling Quotient
 
ProCyclingStats: Matthew Goss

1986 births
Living people
Australian Giro d'Italia stage winners
Australian expatriate sportspeople in Monaco
Commonwealth Games silver medallists for Australia
Sportspeople from Launceston, Tasmania
Cyclists at the 2006 Commonwealth Games
Cyclists at the 2012 Summer Olympics
Cyclists from Tasmania
Olympic cyclists of Australia
UCI Track Cycling World Champions (men)
Commonwealth Games medallists in cycling
Australian male cyclists
Australian track cyclists
Medallists at the 2006 Commonwealth Games